WRI is an initialism for:
Worldtech Resources Institute, a business college in Camarines Sur province, Philippines
Weingarten Realty Investors, an American real estate investment trust
Wesley Research Institute, a medical research institute affiliated with Wesley Hospital (Brisbane), Australia
Wolfram Research, Inc., an American software development company
World Resources Institute, a non-profit group working for sustainable natural resource management
War Resisters' International, an international anti-war organization
Weber Research Institute, a research group at the Polytechnic Institute of New York University
"WRI", designation sometimes used for a Write-in candidate
Wire Reinforcement Institute, American trade association for wire reinforcement of concrete construction
.WRI, file extension for a Microsoft Write file
WRI, IATA code for McGuire Air Force Base
Windber Research Institute, a non-profit biomedical research institute in Windber, Pennsylvania
Wuhan Research Institute of Post & Telecommunications, a branch of Wuhan University
Scottish Women's Rural Institutes (known as WRI or SWRI), former name of Scottish Women's Institutes